Sidney Lawrence (December 31, 1801 – May 9, 1892) was an American lawyer who served one term as a U.S. Representative from New York from 1847 to 1849.

Biography 
Born in Weybridge, Vermont, Lawrence moved with his parents to Moira, New York, in early childhood.
He attended the common schools.
He studied law.
He was admitted to the bar and commenced practice in Moira, New York.

He was Justice of the Peace for more than half a century.
He served as supervisor and as assessor.
Surrogate of Franklin County 1837–1843.
He was a member of the New York State Senate (4th D.) in 1843 and 1844.
He served as member of the State assembly in 1846.

Congress 
Lawrence was elected as a Democrat to the 30th United States Congress, holding office from March 4, 1847, to March 3, 1849.

Later career and death 
Afterwards he resumed the practice of law. He also engaged in the real estate business and in banking.
He died in Moira, New York, May 9, 1892.
He was interred in Moira Cemetery.

Sources

1801 births
1892 deaths
Democratic Party New York (state) state senators
Democratic Party members of the United States House of Representatives from New York (state)
Democratic Party members of the New York State Assembly
People from Weybridge, Vermont
People from Moira, New York
19th-century American politicians